Adisura marginalis (new pod borer) is a species of moth of the family Noctuidae. It is found in Myanmar, India, Malaysia, the Philippines, Thailand, Vietnam and Indonesia, as well as the Northern Territory, Queensland and Western Australia in Australia.

The larvae feed on Cajanus cajan.

External links
 Australian Faunal Directory
 Australian Caterpillars

Heliothinae
Moths of Asia
Moths of Australia
Moths described in 1858